Arakeri  is a village in the southern state of Karnataka, India. It is located in the Bijapur Taluka of Bijapur District in Karnataka.

Demographics
 India census, Arakeri had a population of 8,184 with 4,320 males and 3,864 females.

See also
 Bijapur district, Karnataka

References

External links
 http://Bijapur.nic.in/

Villages in Bijapur district, Karnataka